Sohail Quadri is a Pakistani politician who was elected as a Corporator to the phattarghatti division hyderabad.

Electoral history

2015 general election

2012 general election

References

1970s births
Living people
Canadian politicians of Pakistani descent
Politicians from Edmonton
Progressive Conservative Association of Alberta MLAs
21st-century Canadian politicians